Hans-Martin Trepp (9 November 1922 – 17 August 1970) was an ice hockey player for EHC Arosa and the Swiss national team where he scored 83 goals in 94 matches. He won a bronze medal at the 1948 Winter Olympics. He appeared in the World Championships four times, winning three bronze medals in 1950, 1951 and 1953.

Trepp played for EHC Arosa from 1939 to 1965, winning seven consecutive national titles from 1951 to 1957.

In 2020 he was introduced in to the IIHF All-Time Switzerland Team.

Death
Trepp died in 1970 after an accidental fall in his home where he fractured his skull.

Personal life
Trepp was the cousin of track cyclist Willy Trepp.

References

External links
Profile at olympedia.org
Profile at eliteprospects.com

1922 births
1970 deaths
EHC Arosa players
Ice hockey players at the 1948 Winter Olympics
Ice hockey players at the 1952 Winter Olympics
Olympic bronze medalists for Switzerland
Olympic ice hockey players of Switzerland
Olympic medalists in ice hockey
Medalists at the 1948 Winter Olympics